Philip Gips (March 28, 1931 – October 3, 2019) was an American graphic designer and film poster artist.

A native of The Bronx, Gips graduated from the Cooper Union, in addition to the Yale School of Art and Architecture.

His most notable works were for the film posters of Roman Polanski's Rosemary's Baby (1968),  Michael Ritchie's Downhill Racer (1969), and Ridley Scott's Alien (1979). All three were voted to Premiere magazine's 50 Best Movie Posters of All Time list. Among his many other film poster credits areTommy (1975), Kramer vs. Kramer (1979), All That Jazz (1979), and Sophie's Choice (1982). Gips also created the logo for the sports channel ESPN.

Gips died on October 3, 2019, at the age of 88. He was buried at Kensico Cemetery in Valhalla, New York.

References

1931 births
2019 deaths
American graphic designers
Artists from the Bronx
Burials at Kensico Cemetery
Cooper Union alumni
Film poster artists
Yale School of Architecture alumni